De Putter or de Putter is a Dutch surname. Notable people with the surname include:

Jos de Putter (born 1959), Dutch film director, film critic, and screenwriter
Pieter de Putter ( 1600–1659), Dutch painter

Dutch-language surnames